This is a list of notable programming languages optimized for sound production, algorithmic composition, and sound synthesis.

 ABC notation, a language for notating music using the ASCII character set
 Bol Processor, a model of formal grammars enriched with polymetric expressions for the representation of time structures 
 ChucK, strongly timed, concurrent, and on-the-fly audio programming language
 Real-time Cmix, a MUSIC-N synthesis language somewhat similar to Csound
 Common Lisp Music (CLM), a music synthesis and signal processing package in the Music V family
 Csound, a MUSIC-N synthesis language released under the LGPL with many available unit generators
 Extempore, a live-coding environment that borrows a core foundation from the Impromptu environment
 FAUST, Functional Audio Stream, a functional compiled language for efficient real-time audio signal processing
 GLICOL, a graph-oriented live coding language written in Rust
 Hierarchical Music Specification Language (HMSL), optimized more for music than synthesis, developed in the 1980s in Forth
 Impromptu, a Scheme language environment for Mac OS X capable of sound and video synthesis, algorithmic composition, and 2D and 3D graphics programming
 Ixi lang, a programming language for live coding musical expression.
 JFugue, a Java and JVM library for programming music that outputs to MIDI and has the ability to convert to formats including ABC Notation, Lilypond, and MusicXML
 jMusic
 JSyn
 Keykit, programming language and portable graphical environment for MIDI music composition
 Kyma (sound design language)
 LilyPond, a computer program and file format for music engraving. 
 Max/MSP, a proprietary, modular visual programming language aimed at sound synthesis for music
 Music Macro Language (MML), often used to produce chiptune music in Japan
 MUSIC-N, includes versions I, II, III, IV, IV-B, IV-BF, V, 11, and 360
 Nyquist
 OpenMusic
 Orca (music programming language)
 Pure Data, a modular visual programming language for signal processing aimed at music creation
 Reaktor
 Sonic Pi
 Structured Audio Orchestra Language (SAOL), part of the MPEG-4 Structured Audio standard
 SuperCollider
 SynthEdit, a modular visual programming language for signal processing aimed at creating audio plug-ins

See also 
 Comparison of audio synthesis environments
 List of music software

References

 
Audio